The following lists events from 2015 in Malta.

Incumbents
President: Marie Louise Coleiro Preca
Prime Minister: Joseph Muscat

Events

February
18 February – The Irish Naval Service donated the patrol boat LÉ Aoife to the Maritime Squadron of the Armed Forces of Malta.

April
11 April – The spring hunting referendum and local council elections were held.

May
4 May – The Parliament of Malta moves from the Grandmaster's Palace in Valletta to the purpose-built Parliament House.

June
June 7 - Mcdonalds Malta celebrated 20 years since its first service in Valletta.

November
11–12 November – The Valletta Summit on Migration is held in Valletta.
27–29 November – The Commonwealth Heads of Government Meeting 2015 is held in Malta.

See also
Malta in the Eurovision Song Contest 2015
2014–15 Maltese Premier League
2014–15 Maltese FA Trophy
Public holidays in Malta

References

 
Years of the 21st century in Malta
Malta
2010s in Malta
Malta